Hidayatullah Khan was the Grand Vizier of Bahadur Shah I. 

He was born as the son of Inayatullah Kashmiri. After his appointment as Wazir, he was known as Wazarat Khan, After a short time, Wazarat Khan asked for the title of Saadullah Khan which was the title of the most renowned Wazir of Shah Jahan. The Emperor replied, "It is not easy to be a Sadullah Khan, let him be known as Saidullah Khan." Nonetheless, he was popularly known by the name of Saadullah Khan.

References

Grand viziers of the Mughal Empire
Year of birth unknown
Year of death unknown